The Armenian highlands (also known as the Armenian upland,  Armenian plateau, or Armenian tableland) is the most central and the highest of the three plateaus that together form the northern sector of Western Asia. Clockwise starting from the west, the Armenian highlands are bounded by the Anatolian plateau, the Caucasus, the Kura-Aras lowlands, the Iranian Plateau, and Mesopotamia. The highlands are divided into western and eastern regions, defined by the Ararat Valley where Mount Ararat is located. Western Armenia is nowadays referred to as eastern Anatolia, and Eastern Armenia as the Lesser Caucasus or Caucasus Minor, and historically as the Anti-Caucasus, meaning "opposite the Caucasus".

During the Iron Age, the region was known by variations of the name Ararat (Urartu, Uruatri, Urashtu). Later, the Highlands were known as Armenia Major, a central region to the history of Armenians, and one of the four geopolitical regions associated with Armenians, the other three being Armenia Minor, Sophene, and Commagene.

The population of the region has been primarily Armenian for most of its known history. Prior to the appearance of nominally Armenian people in historical records, historians have hypothesized that the region must have been home to various ethnic groups who became homogenous when the Armenian language came to prominence. The population of the Armenian Highlands seem to have had a high level of regional genetic continuity for over 6,000 years. Recent studies have shown that the Armenian people are indigenous to the Armenian Highlands and form a distinct genetic isolate in the region. The region was also inhabited during Antiquity by minorities such as Assyrians, Georgians, Greeks, Jews, and Iranians. During the Middle Ages, Arabs and particularly Turkmens and Kurds settled in large numbers in the Armenian Highlands. The Christian population of the western half of the region was exterminated during the Armenian genocide of 1915. Today, the eastern half is mainly inhabited by Armenians, Azerbaijanis and Georgians, while the western half is mainly inhabited by Kurds (including Yazidis and Zazas), Turks, Azerbaijanis, Armenians (included crypto-Armenians and Hemshins).

The region was administered for most of its known history by Armenian nobility and states, whether it was as part of a fully independent Armenian state, as vassals, or as part of a foreign state. Since the 1040s, the highlands have been under the rule of various Turkic peoples and the Safavid dynasty, with pockets of Armenian autonomy in places such as Artsakh. Much of Eastern Armenia, which had been ruled by the Safavids from the 16th century, became part of the Russian Empire in 1828 and was later incorporated into the Soviet Union, while much of Western Armenia was under the rule of the Ottoman Empire and later incorporated into Turkey. Today, the region is divided between Turkey, Georgia, Armenia, Azerbaijan and Iran.

Geography

The Armenian Highlands is part of the Alpide belt, forming part of the Asian range that stretches from the Pontic Mountains to the Malay Peninsula. Its total area is about 400,000 km2. Historically, the Armenian Highlands have been the scene of great volcanic activity. Geologically recent volcanism on the area has resulted in large volcanic formations and a series of massifs and tectonic movement has formed the three largest lakes in the Highlands; Lake Sevan, Lake Van and Lake Urmia. The Armenian Highlands are rich in water resources.

The central, axial chain of Armenian highland ridges, running from west to east across Western Armenia, is called the Anti-Taurus. In the west, the Anti-Taurus departs to the north from the Central (Cilician) Taurus, and, passing right in the middle of the Armenian plateau, parallel to the Eastern (Armenian) Taurus, ends in the east at the Ararat peaks..

To the west is the Anatolian plateau, which rises slowly from the lowland coast of the Aegean Sea and converges with the Armenian Highlands to the east of Cappadocia. The Caucasus extends to the northeast of the Armenian Highlands, with the Kura river forming its eastern boundary in the Kura-Aras lowlands. To the southwest is Mesopotamia (or Fertile Crescent).  

Most of the Armenian Highlands is in present-day eastern Anatolia, and also includes northwestern Iran, all of Armenia, southern Georgia, and western Azerbaijan. Its northeastern parts are also known as Lesser Caucasus, which is a center of Armenian culture.

History

Prehistory
From 4000 to 1000 BC, tools and trinkets of copper, bronze and iron were commonly produced in this region and traded in neighboring lands where those metals were less abundant. It is also traditionally believed to be one of the possible locations of the Garden of Eden.

Antiquity
The Armenian Plateau has been called the "epicenter of the Iron Age", since it appears to be the location of the first appearance of Iron Age metallurgy in the late 2nd millennium BC. In the Early Iron Age, the Kingdom of Van controlled much of the region, until it was overthrown by the Medes and Orontid dynasty.

In the Epic of Gilgamesh, the land of Aratta is placed in a geographic space that could be describing the Armenian plateau. In Antiquity, the population living on the Highlands was ethnically diverse, but in the Achaemenid period (550–330 BC), Armenian-speakers came to prominence. Recent studies have shown that Armenians are indigenous to the Armenian Highlands and form a distinct genetic isolate in the region. There are signs of considerable genetic admixture in Armenians between 3000 BC and 2000 BC, these mixture dates also coincide with the legendary establishment of Armenia in 2492 BCE, but they subside to insignificant levels since 1200 BC, remaining stable until today.

Middle Ages: Turkic conquests

Seljuk Turks first arrived in the Armenian highlands in the 1040s and expanded westward, conquering territories and populating the peninsula until finally the Ottoman Empire was declared in 1299. The Seljuks' victory at the Battle of Manzikert made them dominant in the region. Ruben I, Prince of Armenia, led some Armenians out of the Highlands and escaped into the mountains of Cilicia, where they founded the Armenian Kingdom of Cilicia.

In the early 13th century, as various peoples fled from the advancing Mongol onslaught, the Highlands saw the migrations of the Karluk and Kharizmian peoples. The Mongols, who did not distinguish between Christianity and Islam, reached the Highlands in 1235. With their arrival, Armenia became part of "the East" in its entirety for the first time since the territory was partitioned during the Byzantine–Sasanian wars. Considered the successors of the Abbasids, Sassanids and Seljuks, the Mongols eventually converted to Islam and established their dynasty in Azerbaijan.

In 1410 the area was ruled by the Kara Koyunlu, who ruled until 1468. The pastoral culture of the Kara Koyunlu Turks undermined agricultural practices in Armenia. In 1468, the Ak Koyunlu Turks assumed power; their reign lasted until 1502 when the Safavids brought Armenia under Iranian rule. The Ottoman Turks didn't take control of the highland region until 1514, several decades after Armenians in the Ottoman Empire were given millet status. The Highlands came under Ottoman control following the defeat of the Safavids at the Battle of Chalderon; they appointed Kurdish tribesman to rule over the highlands' local administrative affairs. By 1516, the Ottoman Empire had conquered all of the Armenian lands, including Cilicia.

Early modern period

From the early modern era and on, the region came directly under Safavid Iranian rule. Heavily contested for centuries between the Iranian Safavids and its archrival the Ottoman Empire, with numerous wars raging over the region, large parts of the Highlands comprising Western Armenia were finally conquered by the Ottomans in the first half of the 17th century following the Ottoman–Safavid War (1623–39) and the resulting Treaty of Zuhab. Eastern Armenia, the other major part of the Highlands, stayed in Iranian hands up to the 1828 Treaty of Turkmenchay, when it was ceded to Imperial Russia.

Late modern period

During the first half of the 19th century, the Ottoman-held parts of the Armenian Highlands comprising Western Armenia formed the boundary of the Ottoman and Russian spheres of influence, after the latter had completed its conquest of the Caucasus and Eastern Armenia at the expense of its suzerain, Qajar Iran, after four major wars spanning more than two centuries.

20th century
The Highlands saw a massive demographic shift after the Armenian genocide and fall of the Ottoman Empire, with Western Armenia being relabeled "Eastern Anatolia". Since the Armenian genocide and partitioning of the Ottoman Empire after World War I, the Highlands have been the boundary region of Turkey, Iran and the Soviet Union and, since the 1991 dissolution of the Soviet Union, Armenia, and parts of Georgia and Azerbaijan.

Flora and fauna

The apricot, known by the Romans as the prunus armenicus (the Armenian plum), was brought to Europe from the Armenian plateau.

Notable peaks

Important settlements

See also
 Ark of Nuh or Noah
 Geography of Armenia
 Haykakan Par
 History of Armenia
 Mountains of Ararat
 Mount Tendürek
 Durupınar site
 River system of Mesopotamia
 Euphrates
 Tigris
 Zagros Mountains
 Mount Judi

References

Further reading
 
 

 
Mountain ranges of Turkey
Mountain ranges of Iran
Mountain ranges of Armenia
Divided regions
Plateaus of Asia
Highlands